The Abbey of Saint-Martin in Pontoise, in the Val-d'Oise department of the Île-de-France
region of France was founded in the first half of the 11th century. The abbey was an important centre of pilgrimage due to the canonisation of its first abbot Walter of Pontoise. The Benedictine abbey was taken over by Maurists in the 17th century. The Saint-Martin estate now houses the Saint-Martin-de-France School, run by the Oratorians.

References
Smith, William & Cheetham, Samuel, A Dictionary of Christian Antiquities. Murray, 1875. p. 283.

Christian monasteries established in the 11th century